KLM Flight 592, a KLM Douglas DC-6 was a scheduled passenger flight from Rome-Ciampino Airport (CIA/LIRA) to Frankfurt International Airport (FRA/EDDF). On Saturday 22 March 1952, Flight 592 crashed on final approaching to Frankfurt International around 10:45 AM Local time; 45 of the 47 people aboard the DC-6 were killed.

Aircraft 
On 22 March 1952, KLM Flight 592 was operated using a Douglas DC-6 (registration nr. PH-TPJ). The aircraft first flew in 1948. This was the 12th loss of a DC-6, the 8th fatal accident and the 4th worst accident with the type (at the time, now 20th's worst). After the crash, the aircraft was damaged beyond repair.

Crash 
Nothing more was heard from the flight after this. Around five minutes later, the aircraft crashed into a forest. Of the 47 people aboard, 45 did not survive the crash. The survivors were one crew member and one passenger.

Investigation 
The cause of the crash was not determined, but it was possible that the crew continued the approach below the minimum descent altitude to maintain a visual contact with the ground.

References 

1952 in Germany
Aviation accidents and incidents in 1952
Aviation accidents and incidents in Germany
592
Accidents and incidents involving the Douglas DC-6